This is a list of arcade games sorted by name which were converted to the Amiga platform. In most of these ports graphics and code were made within Atari ST's limitations and ported directly to Amiga.

External links
Amiga arcade ports list
Arcade History Database (all ports are listed on each game pages)

Amiga Arcade Conversions